Set the Night to Music is an album released by Roberta Flack in 1991 on Atlantic Records. The title track, written by Diane Warren and originally the 11th track of Starship's 1987 album No Protection, was remade as a duet with Maxi Priest and reached number 6 on the Billboard Hot 100 and number 2 on the Hot Adult Contemporary chart.  In Canada, "Set the Night to Music" peaked at number nine on the pop singles chart and number one on the Adult Contemporary chart.  It became the 17th biggest Canadian Adult Contemporary hit of 1991.

Track listing
"The Waiting Game" (Claude Gaudette, Alan Roy Scott) - 4:38
Rap performed by Quincy Jones
"Set the Night to Music" (Diane Warren) - 5:23
Duet with Maxi Priest
"When Someone Tears Your Heart In Two" (Bob Gaudio, Madeline Stone) - 4:04
"Something Your Heart Has Been Telling Me" (Bette Midler, Robert Kraft, Barry Reynolds) - 4:56
"You Make Me Feel Brand New" (Thomas Bell, Linda Creed) - 4:58
"Unforgettable" (Irving Gordon; Intro written by Arif Mardin) - 5:30
Duet with Mark Stevens
"Summertime" (Sharon Robinson, Leonard Cohen) - 4:22
"Natural Thing" (Jerry Barnes, Katreese Barnes) - 4:41
"My Foolish Heart" (Ned Washington, Victor Young) - 4:39
"Friend" (Jerry Barnes, Katreese Barnes) - 3:00
"Always" (Irving Berlin; Closing verse written by Roberta Flack and Barry Miles) - 4:35

Personnel 
 Roberta Flack – lead vocals, main backing vocals (1), arrangements (11)
 Steve Skinner – keyboards (1, 4), programming (1, 4), arrangements (1, 4), additional keyboards (8), drum programming (8)
 John Mahoney – Synclavier programming (1)
 Joe Mardin – additional keyboards (1, 4, 10, 11), additional programming (1, 4), keyboards (3, 7, 9), programming (3, 7, 9, 10), synth bass (3, 9), arrangements (3, 7, 10), string arrangements and conductor (7), keyboard solo (10), drum programming (11)
 Robbie Kondor – keyboards (2, 6, 11), programming (2, 6, 11), arrangements (2), additional arrangements (11)
 Robbie Buchanan – acoustic piano (3)
 David LeBolt – keyboards (5), programming (5), arrangements (5)
 Reggie Griffin – keyboards (8), programming (8), drum programming (8), backing vocals (8, 9), arrangements (8)
 Keith Barnhart – additional keyboards (9), additional programming (9)
 Greg Phillinganes – main keyboards (9), keyboards (10)
 Michael O'Reilly – guitar (4)
 Sammy Merendino – drum programming (1, 2)
 Errol "Crusher" Bennett – percussion (2)
 Andy Snitzer – alto saxophone (4), tenor saxophone (6, 9)
 Rob Paparozzi – harmonica (6)
 Arif Mardin – arrangements (1, 4, 6, 8, 9), string arrangements and conductor (2, 6, 9), vocal arrangements (8, 9)
 Shelton Becton – additional arrangements (8)
 Barry Miles – additional arrangements (11)
 Gene Orloff – concertmaster (2, 6, 7, 9)
 Jerry Barnes – backing vocals (1, 2, 4, 5, 8, 9, 10), vocal arrangements (8), arrangements (10), bass (10)
 Katreese Barnes – backing vocals (1, 2, 4, 5, 8, 9, 10), soprano saxophone (4), alto saxophone (8), vocal arrangements (8)
 Quincy Jones – rap (1)
 Maxi Priest – lead vocals (2)
 Mark Stevens – backing vocals (3, 5, 8), lead vocals (6)
 Tawatha Agee – backing vocals (4, 5, 7)
 Rachele Cappelli – backing vocals (4, 5, 6, 9)
 Fonzi Thornton – backing vocals (4, 5)
 Patti Austin – backing vocals (6)
 Lani Groves – backing vocals (6, 7)
 Cindy Mizelle – backing vocals (9)

Production 
 Arif Mardin – producer 
 Joe Mardin – co-producer (3, 7)
 Michael O'Reilly – recording, mixing
 Jack Joseph Puig – additional recording 
 David Richards – additional recording 
 Bruce Buchanan – assistant engineer
 Bruce Calder – assistant engineer
 Steven Deur – assistant engineer
 Suzanne Dyer – assistant engineer
 Steve Holroyd – assistant engineer
 Jeff Lippay – assistant engineer
 Brian Pollack – assistant engineer
 Ken Quartarone – assistant engineer
 Jay Ryan – assistant engineer
 David Schiffman – assistant engineer
 Arthur Steuer – assistant engineer
 George Marino – mastering 
 Suzane Koga – production coordination
 Lisa Maldonado – production coordination
 Bob Defrin – art direction
 Thomas Bricker – design
 Bridgette Lancome – photography

Studios
 Recorded at Atlantic Studios, Unique Recording Studios, The Hit Factory, RPM Studios, Soundtrack Studios and Skyline Studios (New York City, New York); Ocean Way Recording (Hollywood, California).
 Mixed at Right Track Recording (New York City, New York).
 Mastered at Sterling Sound (New York City, New York).

References 

Roberta Flack albums
1991 albums
Albums produced by Ahmet Ertegun
Albums produced by Arif Mardin
Atlantic Records albums